Chronobiology is a field of biology that examines timing processes, including periodic (cyclic) phenomena in living organisms, such as their adaptation to solar- and lunar-related rhythms. These cycles are known as biological rhythms. Chronobiology comes from the ancient Greek χρόνος (chrónos, meaning "time"), and biology, which pertains to the study, or science, of life. The related terms chronomics and chronome have been used in some cases to describe either the molecular mechanisms involved in chronobiological phenomena or the more quantitative aspects of chronobiology, particularly where comparison of cycles between organisms is required.

Chronobiological studies include but are not limited to comparative anatomy, physiology, genetics, molecular biology and behavior of organisms related to their biological rhythms.  Other aspects include epigenetics, development, reproduction, ecology and evolution.

The subject
Chronobiology studies variations of the timing and duration of biological activity in living organisms which occur for many essential biological processes. These occur (a) in animals (eating, sleeping, mating, hibernating, migration, cellular regeneration, etc.), (b) in plants (leaf movements, photosynthetic reactions, etc.), and in microbial organisms such as fungi and protozoa. They have even been found in bacteria, especially among the cyanobacteria (aka blue-green algae, see bacterial circadian rhythms). The best studied rhythm in chronobiology is the circadian rhythm, a roughly 24-hour cycle shown by physiological processes in all these organisms. The term circadian comes from the Latin circa, meaning "around" and dies, "day", meaning "approximately a day." It is regulated by circadian clocks.

The circadian rhythm can further be broken down into routine cycles during the 24-hour day:
 Diurnal, which describes organisms active during daytime
 Nocturnal, which describes organisms active in the night
 Crepuscular, which describes animals primarily active during the dawn and dusk hours (ex: white-tailed deer, some bats)

While circadian rhythms are defined as regulated by endogenous processes, other biological cycles may be regulated by exogenous signals.  In some cases, multi-trophic systems may exhibit rhythms driven by the circadian clock of one of the members (which may also be influenced or reset by external factors).  The endogenous plant cycles may regulate the activity of the bacterium by controlling availability of plant-produced photosynthate.

Many other important cycles are also studied, including:
 Infradian rhythms, which are cycles longer than a day. Examples include circannual or annual cycles that govern migration or reproduction cycles in many plants and animals, or the human menstrual cycle.
 Ultradian rhythms, which are cycles shorter than 24 hours, such as the 90-minute REM cycle, the 4-hour nasal cycle, or the 3-hour cycle of growth hormone production.
 Tidal rhythms, commonly observed in marine life, which follow the roughly 12.4-hour transition from high to low tide and back.
 Lunar rhythms, which follow the lunar month (29.5 days). They are relevant e.g. for marine life, as the level of the tides is modulated across the lunar cycle. 
 Gene oscillations – some genes are expressed more during certain hours of the day than during other hours.

Within each cycle, the time period during which the process is more active is called the acrophase.  When the process is less active, the cycle is in its bathyphase or trough phase.  The particular moment of highest activity is the peak or maximum; the lowest point is the nadir.

History
A circadian cycle was first observed in the 18th century in the movement of plant leaves by the French scientist Jean-Jacques d'Ortous de Mairan. In 1751 Swedish botanist and naturalist Carl Linnaeus (Carl von Linné) designed a flower clock using certain species of flowering plants. By arranging the selected species in a circular pattern, he designed a clock that indicated the time of day by the flowers that were open at each given hour. For example, among members of the daisy family, he used the hawk's beard plant which opened its flowers at 6:30 am and the hawkbit which did not open its flowers until 7 am.

The 1960 symposium at Cold Spring Harbor Laboratory laid the groundwork for the field of chronobiology.

It was also in 1960 that Patricia DeCoursey invented the phase response curve, one of the major tools used in the field since.

Franz Halberg of the University of Minnesota, who coined the word circadian, is widely considered the "father of American chronobiology." However, it was Colin Pittendrigh and not Halberg who was elected to lead the Society for Research in Biological Rhythms in the 1970s. Halberg wanted more emphasis on the human and medical issues while Pittendrigh had his background more in evolution and ecology. With Pittendrigh as leader, the Society members did basic research on all types of organisms, plants as well as animals. More recently it has been difficult to get funding for such research on any other organisms than mice, rats, humans and fruit flies.

The role of Retinal Ganglion cells

Melanopsin as a circadian photopigment
In 2002, Hattar and his colleagues showed that melanopsin plays a key role in a variety of photic responses, including pupillary light reflex, and synchronization of the biological clock to daily light-dark cycles. He also described the role of melanopsin in ipRGCs. Using a rat melanopsin gene, a melanopsin-specific antibody, and fluorescent immunocytochemistry, the team concluded that melanopsin is expressed in some RGCs. Using a Beta-galactosidase assay, they found that these RGC axons exit the eyes together with the optic nerve and project to the suprachiasmatic nucleus (SCN), the primary circadian pacemaker in mammals. They also demonstrated that the RGCs containing melanopsin were intrinsically photosensitive. Hattar concluded that melanopsin is the photopigment in a small subset of RGCs that contributes to the intrinsic photosensitivity of these cells and is involved in their non-image forming functions, such as photic entrainment and pupillary light reflex.

Melanopsin cells relay inputs from rods and cones

Hattar, armed with the knowledge that melanopsin was the photopigment responsible for the photosensitivity of ipRGCs, set out to study the exact role of the ipRGC in photoentrainment. In 2008, Hattar and his research team transplanted diphtheria toxin genes into the mouse melanopsin gene locus to create mutant mice that lacked ipRGCs. The research team found that while the mutants had little difficulty identifying visual targets, they could not entrain to light-dark cycles.  These results led Hattar and his team to conclude that ipRGCs do not affect image-forming vision, but significantly affect non-image forming functions such as photoentrainment.

Distinct ipRGCs
Further research has shown that ipRGCs project to different brain nuclei to control both non-image forming and image forming functions. These brain regions include the SCN, where input from ipRGCs is necessary to photoentrain circadian rhythms, and the olivary pretectal nucleus (OPN), where input from ipRGCs control the pupillary light reflex. Hattar and colleagues conducted research that demonstrated that ipRGCs project to hypothalamic, thalamic, stratal, brainstem and limbic structures. Although ipRGCs were initially viewed as a uniform population, further research revealed that there are several subtypes with distinct morphology and physiology. Since 2011, Hattar's laboratory has contributed to these findings and has successfully distinguished subtypes of ipRGCs.

Diversity of ipRGCs
Hattar and colleges utilized Cre-based strategies for labeling ipRGCs to reveal that there are at least five ipRGC subtypes that project to a number of central targets. Five classes of ipRGCs, M1 through M5, have been characterized to date in rodents. These classes differ in morphology, dendritic localization, melanopsin content, electrophysiological profiles, and projections.

Diversity in M1 cells
Hattar and his co-workers discovered that, even among the subtypes of ipRGC, there can be designated sets that differentially control circadian versus pupillary behavior. In experiments with M1 ipRGCs, they discovered that the transcription factor Brn3b is expressed by M1 ipRGCs that target the OPN, but not by ones that target the SCN. Using this knowledge, they designed an experiment to cross Melanopsin-Cre mice with mice that conditionally expressed a toxin from the Brn3b locus. This allowed them to selectively ablate only the OPN projecting M1 ipRGCS, resulting in a loss of pupil reflexes. However, this did not impair circadian photo entrainment. This demonstrated that the M1 ipRGC consist of molecularly distinct subpopulations that innervate different brain regions and execute specific light-induced functions. This isolation of a 'labeled line' consisting of differing molecular and functional properties in a highly specific ipRGC subtype was an important first for the field. It also underscored the extent to which molecular signatures can be used to distinguish between RGC populations that would otherwise appear the same, which in turn facilitates further investigation into their specific contributions to visual processing.

Psychological impact of light exposure
Previous studies in circadian biology have established that exposure to light during abnormal hours leads to sleep deprivation and disruption of the circadian system, which affect mood and cognitive functioning. While this indirect relationship had been corroborated, not much work had been done to examine whether there was a direct relationship between irregular light exposure, aberrant mood, cognitive function, normal sleep patterns and circadian oscillations. In a study published in 2012, the Hattar Laboratory was able to show that deviant light cycles directly induce depression-like symptoms and lead to impaired learning in mice, independent of sleep and circadian oscillations.

Effect on mood
ipRGCs project to areas of the brain that are important for regulating circadian rhythmicity and sleep, most notably the SCN, subparaventricular nucleus, and the ventrolateral preoptic area. In addition, ipRGCs transmit information to many areas in the limbic system, which is strongly tied to emotion and memory. To examine the relationship between deviant light exposure and behavior, Hattar and his colleagues studied mice exposed to alternating 3.5-hour light and dark periods (T7 mice) and compared them with mice exposed to alternating 12-hour light and dark periods (T24 mice).  Compared to a T24 cycle, the T7 mice got the same amount of total sleep and their circadian expression of PER2, an element of the SCN pacemaker, was not disrupted. Through the T7 cycle, the mice were exposed to light at all circadian phases. Light pulses presented at night lead to expression of the transcription factor c-Fos in the amygdala, lateral habenula, and subparaventricular nucleus further implicating light's possible influence on mood and other cognitive functions.

Mice subjected to the T7 cycle exhibited depression-like symptoms, exhibiting decreased preference for sucrose (sucrose anhedonia) and exhibiting more immobility than their T24 counterparts in the forced swim test (FST).  Additionally, T7 mice maintained rhythmicity in serum corticosterone, however the levels were elevated compared to the T24 mice, a trend that is associated with depression. Chronic administration of the antidepressant Fluoxetine lowered corticosterone levels in T7 mice and reduced depression-like behavior while leaving their circadian rhythms unaffected.

Effect on learning
The hippocampus is a structure in the limbic system that receives projections from ipRGCs. It is required for the consolidation of short-term memories into long-term memories as well as spatial orientation and navigation. Depression and heightened serum corticosterone levels are linked to impaired hippocampal learning. Hattar and his team analyzed the T7 mice in the Morris water maze (MWM), a spatial learning task that places a mouse in a small pool of water and tests the mouse's ability to locate and remember the location of a rescue platform located just below the waterline.  Compared to the T24 mice, the T7 mice took longer to find the platform in subsequent trials and did not exhibit a preference for the quadrant containing the platform. In addition, T7 mice exhibited impaired hippocampal long-term potentiation (LTP) when subjected to theta burst stimulation (TBS). Recognition memory was also affected, with T7 mice failing to show preference for novel objects in the novel object recognition test.

Necessity of ipRGCs
Mice without (Opn4aDTA/aDTA mice) are not susceptible to the negative effects of an aberrant light cycle, indicating that light information transmitted through these cells plays an important role in regulation of mood and cognitive functions such as learning and memory.

Research developments
Light and melatonin
More recently, light therapy and melatonin administration have been explored by Alfred J. Lewy (OHSU), Josephine Arendt (University of Surrey, UK) and other researchers as a means to reset animal and human circadian rhythms. Additionally, the presence of low-level light at night accelerates circadian re-entrainment of hamsters of all ages by 50%; this is thought to be related to simulation of moonlight.

In the second half of 20th century, substantial contributions and formalizations have been made by Europeans such as Jürgen Aschoff and Colin Pittendrigh, who pursued different but complementary views on the phenomenon of entrainment of the circadian system by light (parametric, continuous, tonic, gradual vs. nonparametric, discrete, phasic, instantaneous, respectively).

Chronotypes
Humans can have a propensity to be morning people or evening people; these behavioral preferences are called chronotypes for which there are various assessment questionnaires and biological marker correlations.

Mealtimes
There is also a food-entrainable biological clock, which is not confined to the suprachiasmatic nucleus. The location of this clock has been disputed. Working with mice, however, Fuller et al. concluded that the food-entrainable clock seems to be located in the dorsomedial hypothalamus. During restricted feeding, it takes over control of such functions as activity timing, increasing the chances of the animal successfully locating food resources.

Diurnal patterns on the Internet
In 2018 a study published in PLoS ONE showed how 73 psychometric indicators measured on Twitter Content follow a diurnal pattern.
 
A followup study appeared on Chronobiology International in 2021 showed that these patterns were not disrupted by the 2020 UK lockdown.

Modulators of circadian rhythms
In 2021, scientists reported the development of a light-responsive days-lasting modulator of circadian rhythms of tissues via Ck1 inhibition. Such modulators may be useful for chronobiology research and repair of organs that are "out of sync".

Other fields
Chronobiology is an interdisciplinary field of investigation. It interacts with medical and other research fields such as sleep medicine, endocrinology, geriatrics, sports medicine, space medicine and photoperiodism.

See also
 Bacterial circadian rhythms
 Biological clock (aging)
 Circadian rhythm
 Circannual cycle
 Circaseptan, 7-day biological cycle
 Familial sleep traits
 Frank A. Brown, Jr.
 Hitoshi Okamura
 Light effects on circadian rhythm
 Photoperiodism
 Suprachiasmatic nucleus
 Scotobiology
 Time perception

References

Further reading

 Hastings, Michael, "The brain, circadian rhythms, and clock genes". Clinical review" BMJ 1998;317:1704-1707 19 December.
 U.S. Congress, Office of Technology Assessment, "Biological Rhythms: Implications for the Worker". U.S. Government Printing Office, September 1991. Washington, DC. OTA-BA-463. NTIS PB92-117589
 Ashikari, M., Higuchi, S., Ishikawa, F., and Tsunetsugu, Y., "Interdisciplinary Symposium on 'Human Beings and Environments': Approaches from Biological Anthropology, Social Anthropology and Developmental Psychology". Sunday, 25 August 2002
"Biorhythm experiment management plan", NASA, Ames Research Center. Moffett Field, 1983.
 "Biological Rhythms and Human Adaptation to the Environment". US Army Medical Research and Materiel Command (AMRMC), US Army Research Institute of Environmental Medicine.
 Ebert, D., K.P. Ebmeier, T. Rechlin, and W.P. Kaschka, "Biological Rhythms and Behavior", Advances in Biological Psychiatry. ISSN 0378-7354
 Horne, J.A. (Jim) & Östberg, Olov (1976). A Self-Assessment Questionnaire to determine Morningness-Eveningness in Human Circadian Rhythms. International Journal of Chronobiology, 4, 97–110.
 Roenneberg, Till, Cologne (2010). Wie wir ticken – Die Bedeutung der Chronobiologie für unser Leben, Dumont, .
 The Linnean Society of London

External links

Halberg Chronobiology Center at the University of Minnesota, founded by Franz Halberg, the "Father of Chronobiology"
The University of Virginia offers an online tutorial on chronobiology.
See the Science Museum of Virginia publication Can plants tell time?
The University of Manchester has an informative Biological Clock Web Site
S Ertel's analysis of Chizhevsky's work

 
Biological processes
Circadian rhythm
Neuroscience